The name Rosa has been used for seven tropical cyclones in the Eastern Pacific Ocean.
 Hurricane Rosa (1978) – threatened Baja California.
 Tropical Storm Rosa (1982) – brushed southwestern Mexico.
 Hurricane Rosa (1994) – struck Mexico, killing 4.
 Tropical Storm Rosa (2000) – made landfall in Mexico as a weak tropical storm, causing minimal damage.
 Tropical Storm Rosa (2006) – never threatened land.
 Tropical Storm Rosa (2012) – never threatened land.
 Hurricane Rosa (2018) – made landfall in Baja California as a tropical depression, affected the southwestern United States.

The name Rosa has been used for one tropical cyclone in the Australian region.
 Cyclone Rosa (1979) – struck northern Australia.

Pacific hurricane set index articles
Australian region cyclone set index articles